In the 2021–22 season, WA Tlemcen is competing in the Ligue 1 for the 30th season, as well as the Algerian Cup. It is their second consecutive season in the top flight of Algerian football. They competing in Ligue 1, and the Algerian Cup.

Squad list
Players and squad numbers last updated on 20 October 2021.Note: Flags indicate national team as has been defined under FIFA eligibility rules. Players may hold more than one non-FIFA nationality.

Competitions

Overview

{| class="wikitable" style="text-align: center"
|-
!rowspan=2|Competition
!colspan=8|Record
!rowspan=2|Started round
!rowspan=2|Final position / round
!rowspan=2|First match	
!rowspan=2|Last match
|-
!
!
!
!
!
!
!
!
|-
| Ligue 1

|  
| style="background:#FFCCCC;"| 18th
| 23 October 2021
| 11 June 2022
|-
! Total

Ligue 1

League table

Results summary

Results by round

Matches
The league fixtures were announced on 7 October 2021.

Squad information

Playing statistics

|-
! colspan=10 style=background:#dcdcdc; text-align:center| Goalkeepers

|-
! colspan=10 style=background:#dcdcdc; text-align:center| Defenders

|-
! colspan=10 style=background:#dcdcdc; text-align:center| Midfielders

|-
! colspan=10 style=background:#dcdcdc; text-align:center| Forwards

|-
! colspan=10 style=background:#dcdcdc; text-align:center| Players transferred out during the season

Goalscorers

Includes all competitive matches. The list is sorted alphabetically by surname when total goals are equal.

Transfers

In

Out

Notes

References

2021-22
Algerian football clubs 2021–22 season